Stepping Into Tomorrow is a 1974 album by jazz trumpeter Donald Byrd.

The Allmusic Review by Andy Kellman awards the album with 4 stars.

Track listing 
"Stepping Into Tomorrow" (Larry Mizell) – 5:06
"Design A Nation" (Mizell) – 4:19
"We’re Together" (Mizell) – 4:23
"Think Twice" (Sigidi, Mizell, Mbaji) – 6:10
"Makin’ It" (Harvey Mason) – 3:46
"Rock ‘N’ Roll Again" (Mizell) – 6:08
"You Are The World" (Mizell) – 4:29
"I Love The Girl" (Donald Byrd) – 3:52

Personnel 
 Donald Byrd - trumpet, flugelhorn, vocals
 Gary Bartz - alto sax, soprano sax, clarinet
 James Carter - whistler on "Rock And Roll Again"
 Mayuto Correa - congas
 Margie Evans, Kay Haith, Freddie Perren - background vocals
 Fonce Mizell - trumpet, clarinet, background vocals
 Jerry Peters - organ, piano
 John Rowin, David T. Walker - guitar
 Larry Mizell - Fender Rhodes, ARP synthesizers, background vocals
 Chuck Rainey - bass
 Harvey Mason - drums, bata drums
 Roger Sainte - percussion
 Ronghea Southern - guitar on "Think Twice"
 Stephanie Spruill - percussion, background vocals

References 

1974 albums
Donald Byrd albums
Blue Note Records albums
Jazz-funk albums